Buffa is a surname. Notable people with the surname include:

Annalisa Buffa (born 1973), Italian mathematician
Ernst Buffa, Nazi general
Federico Buffa (born 1959), Italian journalist, writer, and television sportscaster
Paolo Buffa (1903–1970), Italian architect and furniture designer